The Flatinae are a subfamily of planthoppers, erected by Maximilian Spinola in 1839. Genera have been recorded from all continents except Antarctica: especially in tropical and subtropical regions.

Description
Like all other planthoppers, they suck phloem from plants.  The antennae are small and the second segment is longer and ends in a bulge and a flagellum arises from it.  They have two ocelli and nymphs have a tail of waxy filaments.  Of the two sub-families in the Flatidae, the bodies of adult Flatinae are flattened laterally and the tegmina are tent-like (unlike the Flatoidinae, where the body is not laterally compressed and the tegmina are not as tent-like).

Tribes and genera
Eight tribes are included by Fulgoromorpha Lists on The Web (FLOW) and BioLib:

Ceryniini

Auth. Distant, 1906
 Adelidoria Metcalf, 1952
 Adexia Melichar, 1901
 Bythopsyrna Melichar, 1901
 Cenestra Stål, 1862
 Cerynia Stål, 1862
 Copsyrna Stål, 1862
 Doriana Metcalf, 1952

Flatini

Auth. Spinola, 1839
subtribe Flatina Spinola, 1839
 Cameruniola Strand, 1928
 Decipha Medler, 1988
 Flata Fabricius, 1798
 Flatomorpha Melichar, 1901
 Paranotus Karsch, 1890
subtribe Lawanina Melichar, 1923
 Circumdaksha Distant, 1910
 Cromna Walker, 1857
 Eumelicharia Kirkaldy, 1906
 Lawana Distant, 1906
 Neocromna Distant, 1910
 Neodaksha Distant, 1910
 Oryxa Melichar, 1901
 Phylliana Metcalf, 1952

subtribe Phyllyphantina Melichar, 1923
 Neosalurnis Distant, 1910
 Paracromna Melichar, 1901
 Phyllyphanta Amyot & Audinet-Serville, 1843
 Pulastya Distant, 1906
 Salurnis Stål, 1870

subtribe Scarpantina Melichar, 1923
 Colobesthes Amyot & Audinet-Serville, 1843
 Scarpanta Stål, 1862
 Scarpantina Melichar, 1901

subtribe Siphantina Melichar, 1923
 Aflata Melichar, 1902
 Burnix Medler, 1988
 Carthaeomorpha Melichar, 1901
 Dakshiana Metcalf & Bruner, 1948
 Euphanta Melichar, 1902
 Euryphantia Kirkaldy, 1906
 Geraldtonia Distant, 1910
 Hesperophantia Kirkaldy, 1904
 Lesabes Medler, 1988
 Siphanta Stål, 1862
 Utakwana Distant, 1914

Nephesini

Auth. Distant, 1906
subtribe Cryptoflatina Melichar, 1923
 Acrophaea Melichar, 1901
 Anormenis Melichar, 1923
 Antillormenis Fennah, 1942
 Chaetormenis Melichar, 1923
 Cryptoflata Melichar, 1901
 Epormenis Fennah, 1945
 Flatoptera Melichar, 1901
 Flatormenis Melichar, 1923
 Geisha Kirkaldy, 1900
 Gyarina Melichar, 1901
 Hansenia Melichar, 1901
 Ilesia Fennah, 1942
 Leptoflata Lallemand, 1931
 Leptormenis Melichar, 1923
 Melicharia Kirkaldy, 1900
 Melormenis Metcalf, 1938
 Melormenoides Metcalf, 1954
 Metcalfa Caldwell & Martorell, 1951
 Monoflata Melichar, 1923
 Neoflata Melichar, 1923
 Okenana Distant, 1912
 Ormenana Metcalf & Bruner, 1948
 Ormenaria Metcalf & Bruner, 1948
 Ormenis Stål, 1862
 Ormenoides Melichar, 1923
 Panormenis Melichar, 1923
 Paratella Melichar, 1901
 Paroxychara Lallemand & Synave, 1952
 Parthenormenis Fennah, 1949
 Petrusa Stål, 1862
 Phyllodryas Kirkaldy, 1913
 Sephena Melichar, 1901
 Ulundia Distant, 1910

subtribe Nephesina Distant, 1906
 Idume Stål, 1866
 Nakta Distant, 1906
 Neomelicharia Kirkaldy, 1903
 Nephesa Amyot & Audinet-Serville, 1843
 Paraflatoptera Lallemand, 1939
 Tejasa Distant, 1906
 Tetraceratium Muir, 1924
 Unnata Distant, 1906
subtribe Phaedolina Melichar, 1923
 Phaedolus Karsch, 1890
subtribe Pseudoflatina Melichar, 1923
 Caesonia Stål, 1866
 Colgar Kirkaldy, 1900
 Colgaroides Distant, 1910 - Planthoppers
 Dalapax Amyot & Audinet-Serville, 1843
 Gyaria Stål, 1862
 Gyariella Schmidt, 1924
 Pauliana Lallemand, 1950
 Rhinophantia Melichar, 1901
subtribe unplaced
 Acutisha Medler, 1991
 Herbiflata Peng, Fletcher & Zhang, 2016
 Hilavrita Distant, 1906
 Kayania Distant, 1910
 Lecopia Medler, 1991
 Nivalios Zhang, Peng & Wang, 2011
 Nullina Medler, 1991
 Sabaethis Jacobi, 1916
 Sanurus Melichar, 1901
 Somisha Medler, 1991

Phantiini
Auth. Melichar, 1923

 Apolexis Jacobi, 1936
 Byllis Stål, 1866
 Calauria Stål, 1866
 Mesophantia Melichar, 1901
 Microflata Melichar, 1901
 Phantia Fieber, 1866
 Phantiopsis Melichar, 1905

Phromniini
Auth. Distant, 1906

 Acanthoflata Fieber, 1866
 Alcaxor Fennah, 1947
 Anggira Distant, 1906
 Anthoflata Fennah, 1947
 Capistra Fennah, 1947
 Chaturbuja Distant, 1906
 Conflata Schmidt, 1912
 Danavara Distant, 1906
 Delostenopium Jacobi, 1928
 Dermoflata Melichar, 1901
 Flatida White, 1846 (= Phromnia Stål, 1862)
 Flatidissa Metcalf, 1952
 Flatina Melichar, 1901
 Flatiris Fennah, 1947
 Flatosoma Melichar, 1901
 Ityraea Stål, 1866
 Lechaea Stål, 1866
 Ormenina Fennah, 1947
 Papuanella Distant, 1914
 Paraflata Melichar, 1901
 Poeciloflata Melichar, 1901
 Psenoflata Fennah, 1947
 Riculiflata Fennah, 1947

Poekillopterini
Auth. Kirkaldy, 1907
 Poekilloptera Latreille, 1796

Selizini
Auth. Distant, 1906

 Afrocyarda Fennah, 1965
 Afrodascalia Fennah, 1958
 Afroseliza Fennah, 1961
 Anadascalia Melichar, 1923
 Anidora Melichar, 1901
 Arelate Stål, 1862
 Armorseliza Ai, Yang & Zhang, 2019
 Austrodascalia Fletcher, 1988
 Barsac Fletcher, 1988
 Cryptobarsac Fletcher & Moir, 2002
 Cyarda Walker, 1858
 Cyphopterum Melichar, 1905
 Dascalia Stål, 1862
 Dascalina Melichar, 1902
 Dascaliomorpha Melichar, 1923
 Dascanga Medler, 2000
 Deocerus Metcalf & Bruner, 1948
 Derisa Melichar, 1901
 Euhyloptera Fennah, 1945
 Eurima Melichar, 1901
 Eurocalia Van Duzee, 1907
 Eurocerus Metcalf, 1945
 Exoma Melichar, 1902
 Farona Melichar, 1901
 Flatula Melichar, 1901
 Gomeda Distant, 1906
 Grapaldus Distant, 1914
 Griveaudus Stroinski & Swierczewski, 2014
 Hameishara Linnavuori, 1973
 Hyphancylus Fowler, 1904
 Increda Medler, 2001
 Jamella Kirkaldy, 1906 (J. australiae, or pandanus planthopper, pest to Pandanus tectorius)
 Juba Jacobi, 1901
 Kelyflata Swierczewski & Stroinski, 2019
 Ketumala Distant, 1906
 Lembakaria Swierczewski & Stroinski, 2019
 Leptodascalia Melichar, 1923
 Locrona Fennah, 1945
 Massila Walker, 1862
 Meulona Zia, 1935
 Mistharnophantia Kirkaldy, 1907
 Mosiona Melichar, 1923
 Paradascalia Metcalf, 1938
 Paragomeda Distant, 1914
 Paraketumala Distant, 1912
 Paraseliza Melichar, 1923
 Planodascalia Metcalf & Bruner, 1948
 Pseudodascalia Melichar, 1923
 Pseudoseliza Peng, Wang & Zhang, 2010
 Sajuba Medler, 2001
 Satapa Distant, 1906
 Scarposa Uhler, 1895
 Seliza Stål, 1862
 Stenocyarda Fennah, 1965
 Urana Melichar, 1902
 Zarudnya Melichar, 1901
 Zecheuna Zia, 1935

Sisciini
Auth. Melichar, 1923
 Aulophorina Strand, 1928
 Euryprosthius Karsch, 1890
 Latois Stål, 1866
 Phlebopterum Stål, 1854
 Siscia Stål, 1870

incertae sedis

 Anaya Distant, 1906
 Byllisana Metcalf & Bruner, 1948
 Daeda Banks, 1910
 Daksha Distant, 1906
 Flatopsis Melichar, 1902
 Hypsiphanta Jacobi, 1928
 Mimophantia Matsumura, 1900
 Paradaksha Distant, 1910
 Phymoides Distant, 1910
 Pulaha Distant, 1906
 Summanus Distant, 1916
 unplaced monotypic genera from Socotra island:
 Haloflata Swierczewski, Malenovsky & Stroinski, 2017
 Medleria Swierczewski, Malenovsky & Stroinski, 2018

References

External links
 
 

Flatidae
Hemiptera subfamilies